MLX or mlx may refer to:

Malatya Erhaç Airport, Turkey, by IATA Airport code
mlx, or microlux, an SI unit of illumination equal to 10−3 lux
MLX (gene), a human gene encoding max-like protein X
MLX (software), software for entering binary data from magazines
MLX Skates, a brand of high performance ice hockey skates introduced at the 2010 Winter Olympic Games
Multi-Line Extension telephone, a digital telephone used with a popular series of PBX system
 MLX, the Roman numeral for 1060